The 2005–06 Nevada Wolf Pack men's basketball team represented the University of Nevada, Reno during the 2005–06 NCAA Division I men's basketball season. The Wolf Pack, led by head coach Mark Fox, played their home games at the Lawlor Events Center on their campus in Reno, Nevada as members of the Western Athletic Conference (WAC).

After finishing atop the conference regular season standings, Nevada won the WAC tournament to receive an automatic bid to the NCAA tournament as No. 5 seed in the Midwest Region. The Wolf Pack were upset by No. 12 seed Montana in the opening round. The team finished with a record of 27–6 (13–3 WAC).

Roster

Schedule and results

|-
!colspan=9 style=| Regular season

|-
!colspan=9 style=| WAC tournament

|-
!colspan=9 style=| NCAA tournament

Source

Rankings

Awards and honors
Nick Fazekas – WAC Player of the Year
Mark Fox – WAC Coach of the Year

References

Nevada Wolf Pack men's basketball seasons
Nevada
Nevada
Nevada Wolf Pack
Nevada Wolf Pack